Henry Robert James Sprinks (19 August 1905 – 23 May 1986) was an English first-class cricketer. Sprinks was a right-handed batsman who bowled right-arm fast.

Sprinks made his first-class debut for Hampshire against Essex in the 1925 County Championship.

Sprinks next represented the club in 1928, making regular appearances for the club from 1928 to 1929. Sprinks represented Hampshire in 21 first-class matches. Sprinks' final appearance for the county came against Essex. Sprinks scored 167 runs at an average of 9.27, with a high score of 40. With the ball Sprinks took 29 wickets for Hampshire at a bowling average of 46.13, with best figures of 4/56.

Sprinks died at Bramshaw, Hampshire on 23 May 1986.

External links
Henry Sprinks at Cricinfo
Henry Sprinks at CricketArchive
Matches and detailed statistics for Henry Sprinks

1905 births
1986 deaths
Sportspeople from Alexandria
English cricketers
Hampshire cricketers
British expatriates in Egypt